Camila Fernanda Gomes Rodrigues (born 2 January 2001), known as Camila Gomes or just Camila, is a Brazilian footballer who plays as a goalkeeper for Santos.

Career
Born in São Luís, Maranhão, Camila made her senior debut with hometown side Sampaio Corrêa in 2017. She subsequently played for Viana and Chapecoense, scoring a goal for the latter in a 1–5 Campeonato Brasileiro Série A2 loss against Palmeiras.

Camila moved to Internacional for the remainder of the 2019 season, but joined Iranduba on 7 January 2020, after not playing. On 19 September, she signed for Santos.

Honours
Santos
Copa Paulista de Futebol Feminino: 2020

References

2001 births
Living people
People from São Luís, Maranhão
Brazilian women's footballers
Women's association football goalkeepers
Campeonato Brasileiro de Futebol Feminino Série A1 players
Santos FC (women) players
Sportspeople from Maranhão
Sport Club Internacional (women) players